This is a list of amphibian species found in the wild in Korea, including the Korean Peninsula and Jeju Island.  A total of 20 species of amphibians are known from Korea; this includes two species of salamander that were not discovered until the 21st century.

This list treats the taxonomic designations found in Frost (2007) as authoritative.  There have been major revisions of amphibian taxonomy, including the taxonomy of many Korean species, since the late 20th century.  This has included studies which have found species such as the Korean brown frog and Imienpo Station frog, which were previously considered to be Korean varieties or subspecies of more widespread species, to be distinct.  It has also included a wholesale revision of the taxonomy of the Ranidae, or true frogs—for example, the common dark-spotted frog was formerly classified as Rana nigromaculata but is now classified as Pelophylax nigromaculatus.

The following abbreviations are used in the list:
I:  International status, as given in the IUCN Red List
K:  General status in Korea, as given in various sources
SK:  Legal status in South Korea
NK:  Legal status in North Korea

Salamanders

Frogs and toads

See also
List of mammals of Korea
List of reptiles of Korea
List of freshwater fish of Korea

Notes

References
Unofficial English translations are marked with angle brackets, <>.

Frost, Darrel R. (2007) Amphibian Species of the World: an Online Reference. Version 5.0 (1 February 2007). Electronic Database accessible at https://web.archive.org/web/20071024033938/http://research.amnh.org/herpetology/amphibia/index.php. American Museum of Natural History, New York, USA.

External links
 Amphibians of Korea
 Rare and endangered reptiles and amphibians of Korea
 Protected species of South Korea

Amphibians
Amphibians
Korea